Midway, Illinois may refer to the following places in the U.S. state of Illinois:
Midway, Christian County, Illinois, an unincorporated community
Midway, Fulton County, Illinois, a ghost town
Midway, Madison County, Illinois, an unincorporated community
Midway, Massac County, Illinois, an unincorporated community
Midway, Tazewell County, Illinois, an unincorporated community
Midway, Vermilion County, Illinois, an unincorporated community
Midway International Airport, an airport in Chicago, Illinois
Midway Plaisance, a park on the South Side of Chicago, known locally as the Midway